Avahi is a free zero-configuration networking (zeroconf) implementation, including a system for multicast DNS/DNS-SD service discovery. It is licensed under the GNU Lesser General Public License (LGPL).

Avahi is a system which enables programs to publish and discover services and hosts running on a local network. For example, a user can plug a computer into a network and have Avahi automatically advertise the network services running on its machine, facilitating user access to those services.

Software architecture 

Avahi implements the Apple Zeroconf specification, mDNS, DNS-SD and RFC 3927/IPv4LL. Other implementations include Apple's Bonjour framework (the mDNSResponder component of which is licensed under the Apache License).

Avahi provides a set of language bindings (Python, Mono, etc.) and ships with most Linux and BSD distributions. Because of its modularized architecture, major desktop components like GNOME Virtual file system and KDE input/output architecture already integrate Avahi.

Avahi vs. Bonjour 
The Avahi project started in 2004 because Apple's Zeroconf implementation, Bonjour, used the GPL-incompatible Apple Public Source License. In 2006 Apple relicensed parts of Bonjour under the Apache License.

Avahi's performance resembles that of Bonjour, sometimes exceeding it; however Avahi can lose services when managing large numbers of requests simultaneously.

History
Avahi was developed by Lennart Poettering and Trent Lloyd. It is the result of a merger in 2005 of Poettering's original mDNS/DNS-SD implementation called "FlexMDNS", and Lloyd's original code called "Avahi". While most of today's code originates from the former project, the name of the latter was used for the joint project. Development on "FlexMDNS" started in late 2004, and work on the original "Avahi" began in early 2004.

Avahi was originally developed under the freedesktop.org umbrella, but has now become a separate project. Avahi, however, makes use of freedesktop.org's D-Bus IPC layer.

The name Avahi is the Malagasy native name and scientific Latin name of a genus of woolly lemur, a family of primates indigenous to Madagascar. Trent Lloyd found the name, liked it, and it stuck. The logo reflects this. Perhaps in coincidence, Avahi backwards is "I-hav-a", a description of a discovery advertisement.

See also 

 Linux on the desktop
 Lightweight Directory Access Protocol
 Network Information Service
 OSGi Alliance

References

External links
 
 Talk and slides by Poettering/Lloyd at linux.conf.au 2007

Freedesktop.org
Applications using D-Bus
Free network-related software
Free software programmed in C
GNOME
KDE